Alvise Pisani (1 January 1664 in Venice – 17 June 1741 in Venice) was the 114th Doge of Venice, serving from 17 January 1735 until his death.  Born as a member of Pisani family, he was a career diplomat prior to his election, serving as Venice's ambassador to France, Austria, and Spain; he also served as a councilor to previous Doges.  He was succeeded as Doge by Pietro Grimani. His dogaressa was Elena Badoero.

References

1664 births
1741 deaths
18th-century Doges of Venice
Ambassadors of the Republic of Venice to Austria
Ambassadors of the Republic of Venice to France
Ambassadors of the Republic of Venice to Spain
Pisani family